Dubai Chamber of Commerce and Industry, also referred to as the Chamber of Commerce Building, is a building in Dubai, United Arab Emirates (UAE).  Located in eastern Dubai in Deira, the building is the headquarters of the Dubai Chamber of Commerce and Industry.  It is located in the Rigga Al Buteen community, along Dubai Creek and is part of the old Dubai downtown.

At  in height, the Chamber of Commerce building was the seventh-tallest building in Dubai at the time of its construction in 1995 (after Dubai World Trade Centre, Deira Tower, Dubai Creek Tower, Arbift Tower, Al Reem Tower and Etisalat Tower 1).  When seen from Bur Dubai, the building is located to the right of the National Bank of Dubai headquarters.

References 

Buildings and structures in Dubai
1995 establishments in the United Arab Emirates
Office buildings completed in 1995